James Dean Pereira (born July 17, 1983 in Maranhão) is a boxer from Brazil, who won the bronze medal in the flyweight division (– 51 kg) at the 2003 Pan American Games in Santo Domingo, Dominican Republic.

He added another bronze at bantamweight at the 2007 PanAm Games after losing to eventual winner Carlos Cuadras in the semifinal.

References
 Folha Online

1983 births
Living people
Flyweight boxers
Boxers at the 2003 Pan American Games
Boxers at the 2007 Pan American Games
Brazilian male boxers
Pan American Games bronze medalists for Brazil
Pan American Games medalists in boxing
South American Games gold medalists for Brazil
South American Games medalists in boxing
Competitors at the 2002 South American Games
Medalists at the 2003 Pan American Games
Medalists at the 2007 Pan American Games
Sportspeople from Maranhão
20th-century Brazilian people
21st-century Brazilian people